Horrilysin (Crotalus horridus metalloendopeptidase, hemorrhagic proteinase IV, Crotalus horridus horridus venom hemorrhagic proteinase) is an enzyme. This enzyme catalyses the following chemical reaction

 Cleavage of only the single bond Ala14-Leu in the insulin B chain, Ser12-Leu in the A chain, and Ile-Gly, Pro-Ala, and Ser-Trp in melittin

This endopeptidase is present in the venom of the timber rattlesnake (Crotalus horridus horridus)

References

External links 
 

EC 3.4.24